Silicon Alley Reporter was an American trade publication focused on New York's Silicon Alley.

Founded by Jason Calacanis in 1996, then was renamed the Venture Reporter in 2001 and was eventually sold to Dow Jones in 2003.

Rafat Ali served as Managing Editor before founding paidContent.org and its parent company ContentNext Media.

Notable contributors include Xeni Jardin, Rafat Ali and Clay Shirky. The parent company of Silicon Alley Reporter and Venture Reporter was called Rising Tide Studios.

Karol Martesko-Fenster collaborated with Jason Calacanis and Gordon Gould from 1997 to 1999 on the launch of Silicon Alley Reporter prior to joining Rising Tide Studios in April 1999. He served as President & Publisher until mid-2001.

The Silicon Alley Reporter 100, the list of the 100 most influential people in New York Technology, was published annually.

References

 Ryan Naraine (October 8, 2001). Silicon Alley Reporter Goes Under. via clickZ news.
 Rafat Ali (April 11, 2003). Enhanced Silicon: Venture Reporter Bought Out. via paidcontent.org
 Janelle Brown (March 3, 2000). Who decides who in Silicon Alley via Slate
 Greg Lindsay (March 28, 2007). So What Do You Do, Rafat Ali? via MediaBistro
 ContentNext Media ContentNext Media homepage
 Amy Harmon (October 8, 2001) Requiem for a Cheerleader: Silicon Alley Magazine Is Dead New York Times
 Ben Popper (March 18, 2011) The Silicon Alley Reporter 100: 10 Years Later, Where Are They Now? BetaBeat
 Mary Huhn (April 18, 1999) Silicon Alley Reporter Being Courted by the Bigs New York Post
 Jennifer Rewick (February 29, 2000) Silicon Alley Reporter Seeks Some Silicon Alley Investors Wall Street Journal

Business magazines published in the United States
Magazines established in 1996
Professional and trade magazines